The Criminal Finances Act 2017 (c. 22) is an Act of the Parliament of the United Kingdom that amends the Proceeds of Crime Act 2002 to expand the provisions for confiscating funds to deal with terrorist property and proceeds of tax evasion.

The Act received Royal Assent on 27 April 2017. According to its long title, the purpose of the Act is to:

Part 3 of the Act creates the corporate offences of failure of a company or partnership to prevent facilitation of UK tax evasion and failure to prevent facilitation of foreign tax evasion offences. Technically these are two distinct offences, depending on whether the tax which is evaded is UK taxation or foreign taxation. Companies and partnerships are required to take 'reasonable' action to prevent the facilitation of tax evasion and Her Majesty's Revenue and Customs (HMRC), who are responsible for implementation of the legislation, argues that "the procedures that are considered reasonable will change as time passes".

Hong Kong-based law firm, King & Wood Mallesons, has described the Act as "a highly effective piece of legislation".

Applications 
The Act was invoked, less than two weeks after its provisions on "unexplained wealth orders" came into force on 31 January 2018, to freeze £22 million of assets belonging to an unnamed oligarch.

References

United Kingdom Acts of Parliament 2017
Tax legislation in the United Kingdom
Tax evasion in the United Kingdom
2017 in economics
Magnitsky Act